Mount Pluto is an extinct volcano in the Granite Chief Range near Lake Tahoe, California. The volcano erupted approximately 2 million years ago producing lava and mudflows that dammed Lake Tahoe. The Northstar California ski resort covers part of the  peak.

References

Volcanoes of California
Extinct volcanoes
Landforms of Placer County, California
Pliocene volcanism
Pliocene California